The City Baths, located at 420 Swanston Street, Melbourne, Victoria, Australia, opened in 1904 as public baths, with swimming pools and bathing facilities. Extensively renovated in the early 1980s, it is now considered one of Melbourne's most architecturally and historically significant buildings.

History

The triangular site between Swanston, Victoria and Franklin streets was reserved for a public bath facility in 1850.

Melbourne City Council opened the first City Baths on 9 January 1860, which housed public baths (three years after the opening of the London Baths). The objective was to stop people from bathing in the Yarra River, which by the 1850s had become quite polluted and the cause of an epidemic of typhoid fever, which hit the city resulting in many deaths. However, people continued to swim and drink the water. The baths were leased to a private operator, but lack of maintenance resulted in such deterioration of the building that the Baths were closed in 1899.

After a design competition was won by John James Clark working in partnership with his son, Edward James Clark, construction of a new building started in 1903, and the bath was opened on 23 March 1904. Strict separation of men and women was maintained, with separate pools (the larger 30 m [100 ft] pool was for men), and separate street entrances. Two classes of facilities were provided, with second class cubicles containing "slipper baths" (where one end is raised and sloped creating a more comfortable lounging position) on ground level, and "first class baths" on the main floor and a mikvah and turkish baths. The popularity of the swimming pool increased with the introduction of mixed bathing in 1947, and it became the venue for swimming competitions.

After a period of decline and demolition threats in the 1970s, the building was saved by a Builders Labourers Federation green ban. Later being extensively renovated and restored in 1981–83, designed by Kevin Greenhatch with Gunn Williams & Fender. The rear furnace and caretakers cottage were replaced with squash courts and gym space in a matching red brick, the pools were restored though most of the numerous changing booths were removed, most of the bath cubicles replaced with other facilities, and a single entrance stair created. The first class ladies baths with the "mikva bath" on the first floor were retained as the spa area.

The baths now house two swimming pools, spa, sauna, squash courts and a gymnasium. The mikveh bath was renovated in 2013. To cater for all types of swimmers, the swimming pool is divided into four lanes: an aqua play lane, a medium lane, a fast lane and a slow lane (or aquatic education, when swimming lessons are given).

The City Baths is the largest swimming pool in the Melbourne central business district.

Architecture

The City Baths is one of the most significant examples of Edwardian civic architecture in Melbourne, combining Edwardian red-brick with rich cream painted Edwardian Baroque elements, in a bold "blood and bandages" palette. The highly articulated facade wraps around the corners of the site, and the roofline is enlivened by multiple cupola-roofed belvederes, the tall pedimented gables of the pool roofs, and roof ridges and vents in red-painted corrugated iron. The three storey central entrance bay incorporates arched openings emphasised by banded voussoirs, and an open pediment on paired pilasters forming the entry, flanked by long two storey wings either side.

References

External links
 Official website
 Working drawings of the renovation held by the City of Melbourne.

Buildings and structures completed in 1904
Heritage-listed buildings in Melbourne
Federation style architecture
Romanesque Revival architecture in Australia
1904 establishments in Australia
Sports venues in Melbourne
Swimming venues in Australia
Bathing in Australia
Public baths in Australia
Green bans
Buildings and structures in Melbourne City Centre
Sport in the City of Melbourne (LGA)